The Chile men's national tennis team represents Chile in Davis Cup tennis tournament and is governed by Federación de tenis de Chile.  The team played in the World Group on 2019 and reached the final one time in 1976, losing the cup against Italy in Santiago. Chile is currently #17 in the ITF Davis Cup rankings. The team is currently captained by former Chilean tennis player Nicolás Massú.

History
Chile began playing at the Davis Cup in 1928, but would not win a tie until 1933, away at Uruguay, winning their first home tie in 1969, against Argentina. That was their only second home tie in their history.

The team's most successful performance at the Davis Cup was in 1976, losing 1–4 to the Italian team in the final held in Santiago, Chile. Since then, Chile have reached the quarterfinals in three occasions: in 1982, losing 1-4 against Australia, in 2006, losing to the USA 2-3, and in 2010, losing to the Czechs 1-4.

In the 2000s, thanks to Olympic gold winners Nicolás Massú and Fernando González, the Chilean team got promoted to the World Group for the first time in 20 years, and played there for every following season, excepting 2008. During this time, Chile went to play 6 World Group playoffs, winning their 4 home ties, against Japan, Pakistan, Australia and Austria, and losing an away tie to Israel. In 2011, Chile lost 1-4 against both the United States and Italy at home, and got relegated to the Americas Zone Group I. Later in 2012, once again they lost 1-4 away at Italy, without Fernando González, retired, and Nicolás Massú, inactive, for the first time in 9 years. Chile went to lose at Ecuador and Dominican Republic in 2013 and got relegated to the Americas Zone Group II for the first time in 23 years. Chile lost at Barbados 2-3 and won at home against Paraguay 5-0 to remain in the Group II for the 2015 season.

Current squad

Rankings as of February 27, 2023

Other active players called:
 Matías Soto #546 singles, #719 doubles (called up but hasn't played)
 Bastián Malla #1299 singles, n/r doubles (called up but hasn't played)

Performances

2010s

2020s

References

External links

Chile
National sports teams of Chile
Tennis in Chile